Ibrahim Sulayman Muhammad al-Rubaish (July 7, 1979 – April 12, 2015) was a terrorist and a senior leader of Al Qaida in the Arabian Peninsula (AQAP), who was held in extrajudicial detention in the United States's Guantanamo Bay detention camp in Cuba. He was released into the custody of Saudi Arabian authorities and then escaped in 2006. He became AQAP's mufti (expounder of Islamic law).

Guantanamo detention
Al-Rubaish was captured near the Pakistan-Afghan border and transferred to Saudi Arabia on December 13, 2006.

When he was captured by the US army in 2001 for alleged connections to Al-Qeda, he was a teacher in Pakistan, ultimately being released from Guantánamo in 2006, a time during which he wrote a famed poem, Ode to the Sea, which caused controversy in India when it was included in the BA second semester syllabus at Calicut University, eventually withdrawing it.

On February 3, 2009, Saudi security officials published a new list of Saudi suspected terrorists.  Al-Rubaish was one of 11 of the 85 men on this list who was a former Guantanamo captive.

AQAP's mufti
In November 2009, a research paper from the think tank The Jamestown Foundation asserted that al-Rubaish was now a mufti for Al Qaeda in the Arabian Peninsula (AQAP).

Call for assassination of Saudi royals
The paper's author Murad Batal Al-Shishani asserted that Al-Rubaish had produced an audio tape Al-Qaida had released in September attempting to justify a recent attempt to assassinate a senior member of the Saudi Royal Family. The paper asserted Al-Rubaish had published a book criticizing Shaykh Salman al-Ouda, a critic of al Qaida's attacks on September 11, 2001. It also claimed that he had released an additional audio tape in November 2009, criticizing the Saudi government's introduction of mixed sex education for children.

Repatriation and escape

Al-Rubaish was transferred to Saudi Arabia on December 13, 2006, then escaped from custody and joined AQAP in Yemen, becoming a senior figure in the group.

Call for jihad
In early 2013, al-Rubaish called for jihad against Americans, saying "It is my duty to spur the Muslims to kill the Americans, to get them out of the Muslims' land", also expressing hope that Sunnis would unite in a war against Shiite Iran.

U.S. terrorist designation and reward
In October 2014, the U.S. State Department's Rewards for Justice program opened a US$5 million reward for Al-Rubaish's location. In December 2014, he was designated a Specially Designated Global Terrorist.

Death

AQAP released a statement in April 2015 announcing that al-Rubaish had been killed with other unnamed individuals in a drone strike near Mukalla in April 2015. It is believed that the drone strike was carried out by the United States.

Writings
Being "the main ideologue and theological adviser" of AQAP, "his writings and sermons were prominent in its publications."

See also
 Poems From Guantánamo

References

External links
 A Poem From Guantánamo: “Ode to the Sea” by Ibrahim al-Rubaish Andy Worthington
 

2015 deaths
1979 births
Assassinated al-Qaeda leaders
Guantanamo detainees known to have been released
Saudi Arabian al-Qaeda members
Deaths by United States drone strikes in Yemen
Detainees of the Guantanamo Bay detention camp
Named on Saudi Arabia's list of most wanted suspected terrorists
People from Buraidah
Saudi Arabian expatriates in Pakistan
People killed in the Yemeni Civil War (2014–present)